Chrysoglossum is a genus of flowering plants from the orchid family, Orchidaceae. Its 4 species are native to China, the Indian Subcontinent, southeast Asia, New Guinea and some islands of the western Pacific.

Chrysoglossum assamicum Hook.f.. - Guangxi, Tibet, Assam, Thailand, Vietnam
Chrysoglossum ensigerum W.Burgh & de Vogel - Sumatra
Chrysoglossum ornatum Blume - India, Nepal, Assam, Bhutan, Sri Lanka, Cambodia, Thailand, Vietnam, Malaysia, Java, Borneo, Sulawesi, Sumatra, Philippines, New Guinea, Fiji, New Caledonia, Samoa, Vanuatu, China (Guangxi, Hainan, Taiwan, Yunnan)
Chrysoglossum reticulatum Carr - Sabah, Sarawak

See also 
 List of Orchidaceae genera

References 

 Pridgeon, A.M., Cribb, P.J., Chase, M.A. & Rasmussen, F. eds. (1999). Genera Orchidacearum 1. Oxford Univ. Press.
 Pridgeon, A.M., Cribb, P.J., Chase, M.A. & Rasmussen, F. eds. (2001). Genera Orchidacearum 2. Oxford Univ. Press.
 Pridgeon, A.M., Cribb, P.J., Chase, M.A. & Rasmussen, F. eds. (2003). Genera Orchidacearum 3. Oxford Univ. Press
 Berg Pana, H. 2005. Handbuch der Orchideen-Namen. Dictionary of Orchid Names. Dizionario dei nomi delle orchidee. Ulmer, Stuttgart

External links 

Collabieae genera
Collabieae